Sargam is a Pakistani musical Urdu film directed by Syed Noor starring the singer Adnan Sami and his ex-wife Zeba Bakhtiar. 

The film was Adnan Sami 's first and only appearance in any Pakistani film. A classical musician Maharaj Ghulam Hussain Kathak appeared as an actor in this film. 

The song 'Woh Mujhey Yaad Aaya' was sung by the Pakistani pop artist Hadiqa Kiyani.

This film won eight Nigar Awards in 1995.

Soundtrack
Most of the film songs were written by Riaz ur Rehman Saghar, music by Adnan Sami Khan.
The music was composed by Adnan Sami Khan. 
"Aae Khuda, aae Khuda, jis nay ki justuju"...  (Singer: Adnan Sami Khan), lyrics by the poet Muzaffar Warsi
"Suhani rutt ayi, mann jhoomay"...  (Singer: Hamid Ali Khan, Adnan Sami Khan and Hadiqa Kiyani)
"Pall do pall kay hayn andheray"...  (Singer: Adnan Sami Khan)
"Bheega hua mousam pyara"...  (Singer: Adnan Sami Khan)
"Chamki kiran, khilay purwa"...  (Singer: Hamid Ali Khan and Adnan Sami Khan)
"Kab sey khili ho, mujhe abb mili ho" (Classic music vs Pop music)...  (Singer: Maharaj Ghulam Hussain Kathak, Adnan Sami Khan and Hadiqa Kiyani)
"Kya hay, yeh uljhan kya hay...?"  (Singer: Adnan Sami Khan and Asha Bhosle)
"Zara Dholki bajao gorio"...  (Singer: Adnan Sami Khan and Asha Bhosle)
"Pyar bina jeena nahin jeena"...  (Singer: Adnan Sami Khan and Hadiqa Kiyani)	
"Barse Badal, dil mein halchal"...  (Singer: Adnan Sami Khan and Hadiqa Kiyani)
"Woh mujhay yaad aaya"...  (Singer: Hadiqa Kiyani)

Awards

References

External links

1990s Urdu-language films
1995 films
1995 drama films
Nigar Award winners
Films directed by Syed Noor
Pakistani drama films
Films scored by Adnan Sami